William Lawrence Allen (born November 7, 1962) is an American film and television and voice actor.

Allen was born in Wichita, Kansas. He became famous for his role in the 1986 film Rad as BMX racer Cru Jones. Among other roles, William appeared as Roger Sloate in the 1987 Family Ties television episode "Matchmaker". Bill has toured extensively for the band The Pipefitters with his harmonica, alongside actor Lou Diamond Phillips.

Filmography

References

External links

1962 births
Male actors from Kansas
American male film actors
American male television actors
American male voice actors
Living people